Rclone is an open source, multi threaded, command line computer program to manage or migrate content on cloud and other high latency storage. Its capabilities include sync, transfer, crypt, cache, union, compress and mount. The rclone website lists supported backends including S3 and Google Drive.

Descriptions of rclone often carry the strapline Rclone syncs your files to cloud storage. Those prior to 2020 include the alternative Rsync for Cloud Storage.

Rclone is well known for its rclone sync and rclone mount commands. It provides further management functions analogous to those ordinarily used for files on local disks, but which tolerate some intermittent and unreliable service. Rclone is commonly a front-end for media servers such as Plex, Emby or Jellyfin to stream content direct from consumer file storage services.

Official Ubuntu, Debian, Fedora, Gentoo, Arch, Brew, Chocolatey, and other package managers include rclone.

History 
Nick Craig-Wood was inspired by rsync. Concerns about the noise and power costs arising from home computer servers prompted him to embrace cloud storage and he began developing rclone as open source software in 2012 under the name swiftsync.

Rclone was promoted to stable version 1.00 in July 2014.

In May 2017, Amazon barred new rclone users from its consumer Amazon Drive file storage product. Amazon Drive had been advertised as offering unlimited storage for £55 per year. Amazon blamed security concerns and also banned other upload utilities. Amazon's AWS S3 service continues to support new rclone users.

The original rclone logo was retired to be replaced with the present one in September 2018.

In March 2020, Nick Craig-Wood resigned from Memset Ltd, a cloud hosting company he founded, to focus on open source software.

Amazon's AWS April 2020 public sector blog explained how the Fred Hutch Cancer Research Center were using rclone in their Motuz tool to migrate very large biomedical research datasets in and out of AWS S3 object stores.

In November 2020, rclone was updated to correct a weakness in the way it generated passwords. Passwords for encrypted remotes can be generated randomly by rclone or supplied by the user. In all versions of rclone from 1.49.0 to 1.53.2 the seed value for generated passwords was based on the number of seconds elapsed in the day, and therefore not truly random. CVE-2020-28924 recommended users upgrade to the latest version of rclone and check the passwords protecting their encrypted remotes.

Release 1.55 of rclone in March 2021 included features sponsored by CERN and their CS3MESH4EOSC project. The work was EU funded to promote vendor-neutral application programming interfaces and protocols for synchronisation and sharing of academic data on cloud storage.

Backends and Commands 

Rclone supports the following services as backends. There are others, built on standard protocols such as WebDAV or S3, that work. WebDAV backends do not support rclone functionality dependent on server side checksum or modtime.

: 

Remotes are usually defined interactively from these backends, local disk, or memory (as S3), with rclone config. Rclone can further wrap those remotes with one or more of alias, chunk, compress, crypt or union, remotes.

Once defined, the remotes are referenced by other rclone commands interchangeably with the local drive. Remote names are followed by a colon to distinguish them from local drives. For example, a remote example_remote containing a folder, or pseudofolder, myfolder is referred to within a command as a path example_remote:/myfolder.

Rclone commands directly apply to remotes, or mount them for file access or streaming. With appropriate cache options the mount can be addressed as if a conventional, block level disk. Commands are provided to serve remotes over SFTP, HTTP, WebDAV, FTP and DLNA. Commands can have sub-commands and flags. Filters determine which files on a remote that rclone commands are applied to.

rclone rc passes commands or new parameters to existing rclone sessions and has an experimental web browser interface.

Crypt remotes 

Rclone's crypt implements encryption of files at rest in cloud storage. It layers an encrypted remote over a pre-existing, cloud or other remote. Crypt is commonly used to encrypt / decrypt media, for streaming, on consumer storage services such as Google Drive.

Rclone's configuration file contains the crypt password. The password can be lightly obfuscated, or the whole rclone.conf file can be encrypted.

Crypt can either encrypt file content and name, or additionally full paths. In the latter case there is a potential clash with encryption for cloud backends, such as Microsoft OneDrive, having limited path lengths. Crypt remotes do not encrypt object modification time or size. The encryption mechanism for content, name and path is available, for scrutiny, on the rclone website. Key derivation is with scrypt.

Example syntax (Linux) 

These examples describe paths and file names but object keys behave similarly.

To recursively copy files from directory remote_stuff, at the remote xmpl, to directory stuff in the home folder:-
$ rclone copy -v -P xmpl:/remote_stuff ~/stuff

-v enables logging and -P, progress information. By default rclone checks the file integrity (hash) after copy; can retry each file up to three times if the operation is interrupted; uses up to four parallel transfer threads, and does not apply bandwidth throttling.

Running the above command again copies any new or changed files at the remote to the local folder but, like default rsync behaviour, will not delete from the local directory, files which have been removed from the remote.

To additionally delete files from the local folder which have been removed from the remote - more like the behaviour of rsync with a --delete flag:-
$ rclone sync xmpl:/remote_stuff ~/stuff

And to delete files from the source after they have been transferred to the local directory - more like the behaviour of rsync with a --remove-source-file flag:-
$ rclone move xmpl:/remote_stuff ~/stuff

To mount the remote directory at a mountpoint in the pre-existing, empty stuff directory in the home directory (the ampersand at the end makes the mount command run as a background process):-
$ rclone mount xmpl:/remote_stuff ~/stuff &

Default rclone syntax can be modified. Alternative transfer, filter, conflict and backend specific flags are available. Performance choices include number of concurrent transfer threads; chunk size; bandwidth limit profiling, and cache aggression.

Example syntax (Windows) 

These examples describe paths and file names but object keys behave similarly.

To recursively copy files from directory remote_stuff, at the remote xmpl, to directory stuff on E drive:-
>rclone copy -v -P xmpl:remote_stuff E:\stuff

-v enables logging and -P, progress information. By default rclone checks the file integrity (hash) after copy; can retry each file up to three times if the operation is interrupted; uses up to four parallel transfer threads, and does not apply bandwidth throttling.

Running the above command again copies any new or changed file at the remote to the local directory but will not delete from the local directory.

To additionally delete files removed from the remote also from the local directory:-
>rclone sync xmpl:remote_stuff E:\stuff

And to delete files from the source after they have been transferred to the local directory:-
>rclone move xmpl:remote_stuff E:\stuff

To mount the remote directory from an unused drive letter, or at a mountpoint in a non-existent directory:-
>rclone mount xmpl:remote_stuff X:

>rclone mount xmpl:remote_stuff E:\stuff

Default rclone syntax can be modified. Alternative transfer, filter, conflict and backend specific options are available. Performance choices include number of concurrent transfer threads; chunk size; bandwidth limit profiling, and cache aggression.

Academic evaluation 
In 2018, University of Kentucky researchers published a conference paper comparing use of rclone and other command line, cloud data transfer agents for big data. The paper was published as a result of funding by the National Science Foundation.

Later that year, University of Utah's Center for High Performance Computing examined the impact of rclone options on data transfer rates.

Rclone use at HPC research sites 

Examples are University of Maryland, Iowa State University, Trinity College Dublin, NYU, BYU, Indiana University, CSC Finland, Utrecht University, University of Nebraska, University of Utah, North Carolina State University, Stony Brook, Tulane University, Washington State University, Georgia Tech, National Institutes of Health, Wharton, Yale, Harvard, Minnesota, Michigan State, Case Western Reserve University, University of South Dakota, Northern Arizona University, University of Pennsylvania, Stanford, University of Southern California, UC Santa Barbara, UC Irvine, UC Berkeley, and SURFnet.

Rclone and cybercrime 

May 2020 reports stated rclone had been used by hackers to exploit Diebold Nixdorf ATMs with ProLock ransomware. The FBI issued a Flash Alert MI-000125-MW on May 4, 2020, in relation to the compromise. They issued a further, related alert 20200901–001 in September 2020. Attackers had exfiltrated / encrypted data from organisations involved in healthcare, construction, finance, and legal services. Multiple US government agencies, and industrial entities were affected. Researchers established the hackers spent about a month exploring the breached networks, using rclone to archive stolen data to cloud storage, before encrypting the target system. Reported targets included LaSalle County, and the city of Novi Sad.

The FBI warned January 2021, in Private Industry Notification 20210106–001, of extortion activity using Egregor ransomware and rclone. Organisations worldwide had been threatened with public release of exfiltrated data. In some cases rclone had been disguised under the name svchost. Bookseller Barnes & Noble, US retailer Kmart, games developer Ubisoft and the Vancouver metro system have been reported as victims.

An April 2021, cybersecurity investigation into SonicWall VPN zero-day vulnerability SNWLID-2021-0001 by FireEye's Mandiant team established attackers UNC2447 used rclone for reconnaissance and exfiltration of victims' files. Cybersecurity and Infrastructure Security Agency Analysis Report AR21-126A confirmed this use of rclone in FiveHands ransomware attacks.

A June 2021, Microsoft Security Intelligence Twitter post identified use of rclone in BazaCall cyber attacks. The miscreants sent emails encouraging recipients to contact a bogus call centre to cancel a paid for service. The call centre team then instructed victims to download a hostile file that installed malware on the target network, ultimately allowing use of rclone for covert extraction of potentially sensitive data.

Rclone Wars 

In a 2021, Star Wars Day blog article, Managed Security Service Provider Red Canary announced Rclone Wars, an allusion to Clone Wars. The post notes illicit use of other legitimate file transfer utilities in exfiltrate and extort schemes but focuses on MEGAsync, MEGAcmd and rclone. To identify use of renamed rclone executables on compromised devices the authors suggest monitoring for distinctive rclone top level commands and command line flag strings such as remote: and \\.

Rclone or rsync 
Rsync transfers files with other computers that have rsync installed. It operates at the block, rather than file, level and has a delta algorithm so that it only needs to transfer changes in files. Rsync preserves file attributes and permissions. Rclone has a wider range of content management capabilities, and types of backend it can address, but only works at a whole file / object level. It does not currently preserve permissions and attributes. Rclone is designed to have some tolerance of intermittent and unreliable connections or remote services. Its transfers are optimised for high latency networks. Rclone decides which of those whole files / objects to transfer after obtaining checksums, to compare, from the remote server. Where checksums are not available, rclone can use object size and timestamp.

Rsync is single threaded. Rclone is multi threaded with a user definable number of simultaneous transfers.

Rclone can pipe data between two completely remote locations, sometimes without local download. During an rsync transfer, one side must be a local drive.

Rclone ignores trailing slashes. Rsync requires their correct use. Rclone filters require the use of ** to refer to the contents of a directory. Rsync does not.

Eponymous cloud storage service rsync.net provides remote unix filesystems so that customers can run rsync and other standard Unix tools. They also offer rclone only accounts.

In 2016, a poster on Hacker News summarised rclone's relationship to rsync as:- (rclone) exists to give you rsync to things that aren't rsync. If you want to rsync to things that are rsync, use rsync.

See also 

 Rsync

References

External links 
 

2012 software
Cloud storage
Network file systems
Data synchronization
Free backup software
Backup software for Linux
Free network-related software
Network file transfer protocols
Unix network-related software
Free file transfer software
Cloud storage gateways
 
File transfer software
Software using the MIT license
SSH File Transfer Protocol clients
FTP clients
Free FTP clients
MacOS Internet software
Free file sharing software
Cross-platform free software
Free software programmed in Go
Free storage software
Object storage
Distributed file systems
Userspace file systems
File copy utilities
Disk usage analysis software
Disk encryption
Special-purpose file systems
Cryptographic software
Free special-purpose file systems
Cloud computing
Cloud infrastructure
Free software for cloud computing
Backup software for Windows
Backup software
Backup software for macOS
Cloud clients
Cloud applications